Nicosia Municipality (Dimos Lefkosias) is the municipal government which is responsible for all the municipal duties of the southern part of Nicosia.

History

The municipal council was elected according to the Municipal Ordinance of 1882, and the District Commissioner with one Greek and one Turkish adviser undertook municipal affairs since November 1884.

In 1930, the municipal legislation which made the new corporations liable to government audit, was enacted. However, after the 1931 uprising, the municipal councils were supplemented by government appointees. The municipal elections introduced again in 1943.

Until 1958, the Town Clerk held the authority over a team of Greek and Turkish employees who undertook municipal fairs for the whole city. After 1974, it is responsible for all the municipal duties on the southern part of Nicosia.

Office

The first municipal office was at Chariklia Argirides in Nea Agora area. In 1897 the municipal offices moved to the house of Efrosini Tarsi at the Ledra Street, then moved to a place where it became called Municipality Square, then temporarily moved to a building in the cabaret of Luna Park on the Bastion Davila, overlooking Eleftheria Square in 1944.

Gallery

Mayors (1959-present)
Diomedes Skettos, 1959–1960.
George M. Spanos, 1960–1964.
Odysseas Ioannides, 1964–1970.
Lellos Demetriades, 1971–1974.
Christoforos Kithreotis, August 1974.
Lellos Demetriades, October 1974 – 2001.
Michael Zampelas, 2002–2006.
Eleni Mavrou, 2007–2011.
Constantinos Yiorkadjis 2011–present

See also
Nicosia Turkish Municipality

References

External links 
 The Official Website of Nicosia Municipality

Nicosia